Mukesh Mohamed (earlier called Mukesh) is an Indian playback singer who is known for his mass-style singing. As a versatile singer, he sings melody, folk and gana songs. He has sung more than 500 film songs in various Indian languages. He has also recorded a number of devotional albums.  He has performed in numerous live concerts across the world, and has regular appearance in Ilaiyaraaja’s musical orchestras. Mukesh Mohamed has sung some very popular hit songs including “Vaa Saamy” in Annatthe.

Early life 
Mukesh Mohamed was born in Chennai, Tamil Nadu.  His parents are from Seythunganallur village, Tirunelveli district, Tamil Nadu. He was actively participating in singing competitions during his school days. His teacher had foreseen his future in music, and advised him to enter into film industry.  Mukesh Mohamed was determined to make a career in film industry as it was his passion since his childhood. His father, N.P. Abdul Kadar, who was also a musician, trained Mukesh Mohamed to sing some of the toughest classical songs sung by the legendary playback singers including K. B. Sundarambal, T. R. Mahalingam, T. M. Soundararajan and Sirkazhi Govindarajan, and encouraged him to learn music properly.  Mukesh Mohamed, then, started learning music from Dinakaran, a music composer, who changed his name to Mukesh.

Singing career
Mukesh Mohamed started his singing career in Dinakaran's musical orchestra. In the beginning, he used to sing a number of popular Tamil devotional songs.  For more than 15 years he was singing in light music orchestras. Simultaneously, he was participating in different musical competitions organized by leading TV Channels.  In 2002, he was adjudged as  the best singer of the year for “Raja Geetham”, a musical competition conducted by Raj TV, and received the award in the presence of legendary musicians including M. S. Viswanathan, S. P. Balasubrahmanyam and A. R. Rahman. This reward gave him an entry to  film industry.
Mukesh Mohamed's debut in playback singing was for the song “Thee Kuriviyai" in the 2004 Tamil film Kangalal Kaidhu Sei.  A. R. Rahman composed the music. He has sung a number of songs for many popular music directors including Ilaiyaraaja, Srikanth Deva, Bharadwaj, Devi Sri Prasad, D. Imman, Harris Jayaraj, Sirpy,  Karthik Raja, Kannan  and Yuvan Shankar Raja.
Some of Mukesh Mohamed's hit songs include "Enn Theivathaikku’’(Sivakasi), “Love Letter” (Kanna Laddu Thinna Aasaiya), “Azhage Azhage” (Oru Kal Oru Kannadi) and Kacheri Kacheri (Kacheri Arambam).  
He is popularly known for his singing of “Ullathil nalla ullam”, an emotionally loaded hit song from the 1964 Tamil movie Karnan in live orchestras across the world.

Discography

According to popular online media musical sources, the discography of Mukesh Mohamed includes

References

External links
 Raaga.com, Mukesh Songs
Gaana.com, Mukesh Tamil Songs

1980 births
Living people
Singers from Chennai
Tamil playback singers
Tamil singers
Tamil musicians
Indian male playback singers
21st-century Indian singers